Donacia brevicornis is a species of leaf beetle of the subfamily Donaciinae. Distributed in the North and north-Central Europe.

References

Beetles described in 1810
Beetles of Europe
Donaciinae